Mark Lucraft, KC (born 1961 or 1962) is a British jurist and was Chief Coroner of England and Wales—the second person to occupy the role—from 2016 to 2020. In 2020—before relinquishing the role of Chief Coroner—he became Recorder of London, the senior judge at the Old Bailey. The roles were allowed to overlap due to the COVID-19 pandemic. By tradition, the Recorder of London is also appointed High Steward of Southwark, and Lucraft accordingly occupies this role.

Lucraft was educated in law at the University of Kent's law school, graduating in 1983. He was called to the bar in 1984. He became a recorder in 2003, a King's Counsel (KC) in 2006, and a Senior Circuit Judge at the Central Criminal Court in 2017.

As Chief Coroner, he presided over the inquests into the 2017 Westminster attack and 2017 London Bridge attack. As of April 2021, he is presiding over the inquest into the 2019 London Bridge stabbings, which first opened in December 2019.

See also
2017 London Bridge attack
2019 London Bridge stabbing
Murders of Bibaa Henry and Nicole Smallman
2017 Westminster attack

References 

Living people
Circuit judges (England and Wales)
21st-century King's Counsel
Alumni of the University of Kent
Chief Coroners of England and Wales
1960s births
Year of birth missing (living people)